Human biome might refer to:
 Anthropogenic biome, ecosystems on the earth shaped by human influence
 Human microbiome, the ecosystem of microorganisms that inhabit the human body